The Communist Labour Party of Turkey/Leninist is an illegal communist party in Turkey. TKEP/L was founded on September 1, 1990, following a split in the Communist Labour Party of Turkey (TKEP).

Whereas TKEP had started orientating itself towards legal work, TKEP/L wanted to continue armed struggle. It formed an armed wing, the Leninist Guerrilla Units. LGB carries out occasional attacks, but does not engage in regular guerrilla warfare. The last major action by LGB was on December 19, 2000, when it attacked a MHP party office in Istanbul. One MHP member was killed and three injured. The attack was vengeance for the killing of two TKEP/L prisoners.

TKEP/L has an organization inside the Turkish prisons, and TKEP/L prisoners have taken part in hunger strikes. The youth wing of TKEP/L is the 13 March Young Communist League.

See also
 Bangladesh Communist Party (Leninist)
 List of illegal political parties in Turkey
 Communist Party of Turkey (disambiguation), for other groups using similar names

References

External links
Programme of TKEP/L

1990 establishments in Turkey
Anti-ISIL factions in Turkey
Banned communist parties
Banned political parties in Turkey
Communist militant groups
Communist parties in Turkey
Far-left politics in Turkey
International Freedom Battalion
Kurdish organisations
Left-wing militant groups in Turkey
Peoples' United Revolutionary Movement
Political parties established in 1990
Political parties in the Autonomous Administration of North and East Syria